Natalie Casey (born 15 April 1980) is an English actress, presenter, narrator and singer. She portrayed Carol Groves in the television show Hollyoaks (1996–2000) and Donna Henshaw in Two Pints of Lager and a Packet of Crisps (2001–2011).

Early life
Casey was born on 15 April 1980 in Rawtenstall, Lancashire. Her older sister is the actress Anna-Jane Casey. She attended Oldham Theatre Workshop with her longtime friend Antony Cotton.

Career

Music
In January 1984, when Casey was three years old, her rendition of the nursery rhyme "Chick Chick Chicken" reached No. 72 on the UK Singles Chart. This made her the youngest female artist to have ever had a solo hit in the UK Top 75 (with seven month old Jessica Smith appearing on the Teletubbies' number one hit in 1997, and Ian Doody in the Top 40 as Microbe aged 3 in 1969). In the same year, Casey appeared on the BBC's Saturday Superstore. During the show, she needed to go to the toilet and asked Boy George to take her. In the 2008 live special of Two Pints of Lager and a Packet of Crisps, she performed the single for the first time in over 20 years.

Television
In January 1996, Casey began playing Carol Groves on the Channel 4 soap opera Hollyoaks, in which she remained for over five years. 

In 2001, she joined the cast of Two Pints of Lager and a Packet of Crisps, playing Donna Henshaw alongside her Hollyoaks co-star Will Mellor. Casey and Mellor were the only two original main characters to appear in all nine series. The final episode was broadcast on 24 May 2011.

Casey has also presented and narrated numerous shows such as Dinner Date from 2014. She co-presented Big Brother's Little Brother in 2001 with Dermot O' Leary.

Theatre
In summer 2007, Casey played Serena Katz in a hit run of the musical Fame at the Shaftesbury Theatre in London. In February 2008, she began playing the role Julia in the pre-West End UK tour of The Wedding Singer. Her other stage credits include The Vagina Monologues (Palace Theatre, Manchester), Hobson's Choice (Watermill Theatre opposite her sister Anna-Jane Casey), Flint Street Nativity (Liverpool Playhouse), Well at the Trafalgar Studios and the Apollo Theatre, opposite Sarah Miles and Ado Annie in Oklahoma! at the Chichester Festival Theatre. She took over from Denise Van Outen in Legally Blonde at The Savoy Theatre as Paulette from 26 April 2011. In March 2012, she played Angela in the revival of Mike Leigh's Abigail's Party at the Menier Chocolate Factory, later transferring to Wyndhams Theatre, London.

On 29 June 2012, it was confirmed that Casey would play the role of Judy Bernly in the first UK tour production of the Broadway musical 9 to 5. The tour began at the Manchester Opera House on 12 October 2012. She appeared in the UK tour production of 9 to 5. She appeared in Sex and the Three Day Week from 2014 to 2015, Moving Stories in 2016 and 2017, Things I Know to be True in 2016 and Stepping Out in 2017.

Personal life
Casey lives in the Greenwich area of London.

Filmography

References

External links
 
 Interview in OK magazine

Living people
English television actresses
English soap opera actresses
People from Rawtenstall
1980 births